The 1980–81 English League South season was the third season of the English League South (also known as the Inter-City League), the top level ice hockey league in southern England. Nine teams participated in the league, and the Streatham Redskins won the championship. They qualified for the semifinals of the British Championship by virtue of finishing first in the regular season. The games played by the Universities of Cambridge and Oxford were counted double. (One win/loss is equivalent to two wins/losses.)

Regular season

Playoffs

Semifinals
Streatham Redskins - Nottingham Panthers 3:0
Richmond Flyers - Southampton Vikings 7:0

Final
Streatham Redskins - Richmond Flyers 6:2

External links
 Season on hockeyarchives.info

Inter
Inter-City League seasons